The Bukhtarma Hydroelectric Power Plant (Buqtyrma Sý Elektr Stansasy; , Buchtarminskaja GES) is a hydroelectric power plant on the Irtysh River  upstream of the town of Serebryansk, in East Kazakhstan Province of Kazakhstan. "Bukhtarma" or "Buqtyrma" is a  Kazakh word that can be translated  as "ambush; blocking".

The plant has 9 individual turbines with a total generating capacity of 675 megawatts and generates 2.77 billion kilowatt-hours of electricity per year. The plant is operated by Kazzinc under a long-term concession. It is integrated into Kazakhstan's national electricity system and is used as a peak producer to regulate supply.

See also

 List of power stations in Kazakhstan

References

Hydroelectric power stations in Kazakhstan
Hydroelectric power stations built in the Soviet Union
Dams on the Irtysh River
Kazzinc